Khong Karam Alivand (also Romanized as Khong Karam ‘Alīvand; also known as Karam ‘Alīvand and Khonak Karam ‘Alīvand) is a village in Howmeh-ye Gharbi Rural District, in the Central District of Izeh County, Khuzestan Province, Iran. At the 2006 census, its population was 141, in 26 families.

References 

Populated places in Izeh County